Dark Red is the second studio album by American electronic musician Shlohmo. It was released through True Panther Sounds on April 7, 2015.

Critical reception

At Metacritic, which assigns a weighted average score out of 100 to reviews from mainstream critics, the album received an average score of 69, based on 15 reviews, indicating "generally favorable reviews".

Paul Simpson of AllMusic gave the album 4 out of 5 stars, saying: "The resulting album successfully fleshes out Shlohmo's previous sound into his most accomplished work so far, and ultimately manages to find hope in darkness." Sheldon Pearce of Consequence of Sound gave the album a grade of B−, calling it "a violently loud, dizzying articulation of grief and loss."

Track listing

Charts

References

External links
 

2015 albums
Shlohmo albums
True Panther Sounds albums